Bahey El Din Barakat Pasha (1889–1972) was an Egyptian political figure.

Born in Menyat El Morshed village (in Kafr el-Sheikh Governorate), he studied in Cairo as well as in Paris. Originally a law teacher, he entered politics and was appointed Minister of Education twice during the 1930s. During his tenure, a committee was established to facilitate Arabic grammar rules in order to make it easier for students to study in Arabic. He paid attention to the improvement of textbooks, and created an admission system for the High Institute of Education in 1938. In January of the same year, he inaugurated Egypt's radio broadcasting service.

A leading figure of the Wafd Party during Saad Zaghlul's leadership as well as during the reign of King Farouk I, Bahey El Din Barakat was elected Speaker of the Chamber of Deputies on 12 April 1938, a position he held for a year and a half.

Barakat received the nobiliary title of Pasha on 15 February 1938. He headed the Divan of Accounting from 1945 to 1949. He also served on the three-member Regency Body that was formed following the 1952 Revolution to assume the powers of King Fuad II, who was barely six months old at the time. The Regency Body had no actual powers, however, these having been effectively assumed by the Revolutionary Command Council. Created on 2 August 1952, the Regency Body was dissolved on 14 October of the same year, with Prince Muhammad Abdel Moneim being appointed as sole regent.

References

General
 
Specific

1889 births
1972 deaths
19th-century Egyptian people
20th-century Regents of Egypt
Education Ministers of Egypt
Egyptian pashas
Legal educators
Regents of Egypt
Speakers of the Parliament of Egypt
Wafd Party politicians
People from Kafr El Sheikh Governorate